The forest Oldfield mouse (Thomasomys silvestris) is a species of rodent in the family Cricetidae.
It is found only in Ecuador.

References

Musser, G. G. and M. D. Carleton. 2005. Superfamily Muroidea. pp. 894–1531 in Mammal Species of the World a Taxonomic and Geographic Reference. D. E. Wilson and D. M. Reeder eds. Johns Hopkins University Press, Baltimore.

Thomasomys
Mammals of Ecuador
Mammals described in 1924
Taxonomy articles created by Polbot